Saint-Martin-de-la-Place is a former commune in the Maine-et-Loire department in western France. On 1 January 2018, it was merged into the commune of Gennes-Val-de-Loire. Its population was 1,141 in 2019.

See also
Communes of the Maine-et-Loire department

References

Saintmartindelaplace